Yehuda Hashai (born 3 January 1934) is an Israeli former politician who served as a member of the Knesset for the Alignment from 1980 until 1984.

Biography
Born in Ad Dali' in what is today Yemen in 1934, Hashai made aliyah to Mandatory Palestine the same year. After attending high school, he did his national service in the Paratroopers Brigade. He later studied at Tel Aviv University, where he earned an MA in philosophy and Middle East studies.

In 1961 he joined Mapai, and became a member of the central committee of the Labor Party when it was formed by a merger of Mapai, Ahdut HaAvoda and Rafi in 1968. He served as director of the Yemenite Immigrants department and the Municipalities department. He was on the Alignment list (an alliance of Labor and Mapam) for the 1977 elections. Although he failed to win a seat, he entered the Knesset on 29 February 1980 as a replacement for the deceased Yigal Allon. He retained his seat in the 1981 elections, but lost it in the 1984 elections. He also served as deputy chairman of the Central Elections Committee.

After retiring from public life, Hashai devoted himself to his hobby of photography, and chairs the Israeli Photographic Art Society.

His son Niron is a professor of strategy and international business at Reichman University.

References

External links
 

1934 births
Israeli people of Yemeni-Jewish descent
Yemeni emigrants to Mandatory Palestine
Jews in Mandatory Palestine
Israeli soldiers
Tel Aviv University alumni
Living people
Alignment (Israel) politicians
Mapai politicians
Israeli Labor Party politicians
Members of the 9th Knesset (1977–1981)
Members of the 10th Knesset (1981–1984)